Verräter is a compilation of demos spanning the early days of the American Black Metal band Leviathan. It features two discs of material from previously self-recorded and self-released material by Wrest (Jef Whitehead). After its initial release in 2002 it was re-issued by Tumult Records in 2006 and again in July 2007. The compilation was reissued again in 2019 by Profound Lore Records as a 4xLP vinyl box set, it was  remastered by Dan Lowndes and features extensive new artwork by Canadian artist Abomination Hammer and liner notes by Neill Jameson. Original artwork made by Zdzisław Beksiński.

Track listing

Leviathan (musical project) albums
2002 compilation albums